Patricia Devine (born 25 April 1932) is a British sprinter. She competed in the women's 200 metres at the 1952 Summer Olympics.

References

External links
 

1932 births
Living people
Athletes (track and field) at the 1952 Summer Olympics
Athletes (track and field) at the 1954 British Empire and Commonwealth Games
British female sprinters
Scottish female sprinters
Olympic athletes of Great Britain
Place of birth missing (living people)
Commonwealth Games competitors for Scotland
Olympic female sprinters